
NGC 2207 and IC 2163 are a pair of colliding spiral galaxies about 80 million light-years away in the constellation Canis Major. Both galaxies were discovered by John Herschel in 1835.

The larger spiral, NGC 2207, is classified as an intermediate spiral galaxy exhibiting a weak inner ring structure around the central bar. The smaller companion spiral, IC 2163, is classified as a barred spiral galaxy that also exhibits a weak inner ring and an elongated spiral arm that is likely being stretched by tidal forces with the larger companion. Both galaxies contain a vast amount of dust and gas, and are beginning to exhibit enhanced rates of star formation, as seen in infrared images.

NGC 2207 is in the process of colliding and merging with IC 2163. But unlike the Antennae or the Mice Galaxies, they are still two separate spiral galaxies. They are only in the first step of colliding and merging, with NGC 2207 being in the process of tidally stripping IC 2163. Soon they will collide, probably looking a bit more like the Mice Galaxies. In about a billion years time they are expected to merge and become an elliptical galaxy or perhaps a disk galaxy.

Four supernovae have been observed in NGC 2207:
 type Ia SN 1975a in January 1975 
 type Ib SN 1999ec in October 1999
 type Ib SN 2003H—discovered halfway between the two galaxies
 type II supernova SN 2013ai in March 2013

Two supernovae have been observed in IC 2136:
 type II SN 2018lab
 unknown type SN SPIRITS17lb

See also
Andromeda–Milky Way collision
Antennae Galaxies
Arp 299
NGC 5090 and NGC 5091
NGC 6872 and IC 4970

References

External links

HST: A grazing encounter between two spiral galaxies

Intermediate spiral galaxies
Barred spiral galaxies
Peculiar galaxies
Interacting galaxies
Canis Major
2207
IC objects
18749
UGCA objects
Discoveries by John Herschel
18350124